Let It Rain is the debut album by Canadian country music artist Shirley Myers. It was released by Stony Plain Records in October 1997. The album produced the Top Ten singles "Let It Rain," "Haven't You Heard" and "One Last Step."

Track listing
"Let It Rain" (Shirley Myers, Rod Nicholson, Rick Scott) – 3:05
"Let It Go" (Myers, Nicholson) – 3:07
"One Last Step" (J. Barnes, Myers, Nicholson) – 3:13
"A Rose in the Snow" (Rex Benson, Fran Lee) – 2:54
"Grindin' Wheel" (Kim Bear, Frank Dycus, Troy Lancaster, Scott) – 2:42
"Haven't You Heard" (Myers, Nicholson, Scott) – 3:20
"Fallin' Out of Love" (Myers, Nicholson) – 3:18
"Thirty Nine Days" (Barry Brown, E. Emerson) – 3:39
"Don't Say a Word" (Lorrie Church, Jim Varsos) – 3:33
duet with Johnny Lee
"Long Long Gone" (Myers, Nicholson) – 3:46

Personnel
Larry Beaird - acoustic guitar
Steve Bryant - bass guitar
Jimmy Carter - bass guitar
Chip Davis - background vocals
Greg Dotson - drums
Glen Duncan - fiddle
Owen Hale - drums
Tommy Harden - drums
Dirk Johnson - keyboards
Mike Johnson - steel guitar
Wayne Killius - drums
Troy Lancaster - acoustic guitar, electric guitar
Johnny Lee - duet vocals on "Don't Say a Word"
Shirley Myers - lead vocals, background vocals
Russ Pahl - steel guitar
David Russell - fiddle, mandolin
Curt Ryle - acoustic guitar
Jim Wilson - keyboards

External links
[ Let It Rain] at Allmusic

1997 debut albums
Shirley Myers albums
Stony Plain Records albums